The 2020 Michigan Wolverines baseball team represented the University of Michigan in the 2020 NCAA Division I baseball season. The Wolverines, led by head coach Erik Bakich in his eighth season, are a member of the Big Ten Conference and played their home games at Wilpon Baseball Complex in Ann Arbor, Michigan.  On March 12, 2020, the Big Ten Conference cancelled the remainder of all winter and spring sports seasons due to the COVID-19 pandemic.

Previous season
The Wolverines finished the 2019 season 50–22 overall, including 16–7 in conference play, finishing in second place in their conference. Following the conclusion of the regular season, the Wolverines qualified to play in the 2019 Big Ten Conference baseball tournament, where the Wolverines lost in the semifinals of the Big Ten Tournament to Nebraska. Michigan received an at-large bid to the 2019 NCAA Division I baseball tournament, where they advanced to the College World Series and lost in the championship game to Vanderbilt.

Preseason
Michigan was the only Big Ten Conference team to appear in every national preseason top-25 ranking. The Wolverines were ranked No. 8 by Baseball America, No. 10 by Collegiate Baseball, No. 11 by ESPN/USA Today Coaches Poll, No. 12 by NCBWA, and No. 13 by D1Baseball in their respective preseason polls.

Roster

Schedule

Rankings

Major League Baseball Draft
The following Wolverines were selected in the 2020 Major League Baseball draft:

References

Michigan
Michigan
Michigan Wolverines baseball seasons